Qin Yizhi (born 12 December 1965) is a Chinese politician, best known for his term as First Secretary of the Communist Youth League of China.

Biography 
Qin was born in Xinxiang, Henan province. Qin graduated from Tsinghua University and has an engineering master's degree from Chongqing University. In December 2001, he became mayor of Panzhihua, later he became party chief of Neijiang. In May 2005 he was transferred to serve as assistant to the Chairman of the Tibet Autonomous Region (TAR). In July 2006, he was named Vice Chairman of the TAR. In September 2006, he became party chief of the regional capital Lhasa, and in 2008 joined the regional party Standing Committee. In November 2012 he was named an alternate member of the 18th Central Committee of the Communist Party of China. 

On March 19, 2013, Qin became First Secretary of the Communist Youth League, succeeding Lu Hao. As head of the Youth League, Qin was, ex officio, the president of the China Youth University for Political Sciences, and also held the rank equivalent to a cabinet minister. 

On September 20, 2017, Qin was appointed as Deputy Director of the General Administration of Quality Supervision, Inspection and Quarantine (minister-level). The move was seen as a demotion, taking place only days after it was revealed that Qin did not even get elected as an ordinary delegate to the 19th Party Congress. It also decisively broke with the mold of a long line of Communist Youth League chiefs who soared to higher office later on in their careers.

References 

Politicians from Xinxiang
1965 births
Living people
Tsinghua University alumni
Chongqing University alumni
Political office-holders in Sichuan
Political office-holders in Tibet
First Secretaries of the Communist Youth League of China
Alternate members of the 18th Central Committee of the Chinese Communist Party